Colias flaveola is a butterfly in the family Pieridae. It is found in the Tropical Andes subregion of the Neotropical realm.

Description
Colias flaveola is pale orange yellow in the female, in the rather broad dark distal margin of the forewing are placed four large yellowish-white subapical spots, the under surface has dull sulphur-yellow ground colour. Deeper orange-yellow coloured female specimens are common.

Subspecies
C. f. flaveola Chile
C. f. weberbaueri Strand, 1912 Peru, Bolivia
C. f. mossi Rothschild, 1913 Peru
C. f. blameyi Jörgensen, 1916 Argentina
C. f. mendozina Breyer, 1939 Argentina
C. f. erika Lamas, 1981 Peru

Taxonomy
Accepted as a species by Josef Grieshuber & Gerardo Lamas.

References

External links
Butterflies of America type images

Butterflies described in 1852
flaveola